Kirsti Paakkanen ( Poikonen; 12 February 1929 — 2 November 2021) was a Finnish entrepreneur and business executive.

Career
Paakkanen studied advertising, and worked for many years in the marketing departments of Finnish retail companies including Elanto and Stockmann.

In 1969, Paakkanen set up her own advertising agency, Womena, which she ran for over 20 years, until selling it in 1990 to McCann.

In 1991, Paakkanen acquired the struggling design and fashion house Marimekko from the Amer group (now Amer Sports), and successfully turned it around, growing sales three-fold in a space of five years, and eventually listing the company on the Helsinki Stock Exchange in 1999. She retired from day-to-day running of the business in 2007, appointing  as her successor; two years later Ihamuotila acquired her shares.

Honours and awards
In 1999, Paakkanen was appointed Yrittäjäneuvos ( 'Entrepreneur Counselor') by the President of Finland.

She received two honorary doctorates, in arts (University of Art and Design Helsinki, now part of the Aalto University; 2001) and business (Helsinki School of Economics, now Aalto University School of Business; 2006).

References

Further reading
Konrad, A & Mitchell, J: Marimekko, Harvard Business Publishing (2007) — a case study of Paakkanen's leadership and management philosophy
Paavilainen, U-M: Suurin niistä on rakkaus, Otava (2020) — authorised biography of Paakkanen (in Finnish) 

1929 births
2021 deaths
Finnish business executives
People from Saarijärvi